Oviduct-specific glycoprotein also known as oviductal glycoprotein (OGP) or estrogen-dependent oviduct protein, oviductin or mucin-9 is a protein that in humans is encoded by the OVGP1 gene.

Function 

Oviduct-specific glycoprotein is a large, carbohydrate-rich, epithelial glycoprotein with numerous O-glycosylation sites located within threonine, serine, and proline-rich tandem repeats. The gene is similar to members of the mucin and the glycosyl hydrolase 18 gene families. Regulation of expression may be estrogen-dependent. Gene expression and protein secretion occur during late follicular development through early cleavage-stage embryonic development. The protein is secreted from non-ciliated oviductal epithelial cells and associates with ovulated oocytes, blastomeres, and spermatozoon acrosomal regions.
Beyond the oviduct, OVGP1 is detected in the mouse ovary, testis and epididymis suggesting its roles beyond fertilization. It is not detected in the mouse uterus, cervix, vagina, breast, seminal vesicles and prostate gland 
OVGP1 is expressed by the surface epithelium of the endometrium at the time of embryo implantation in the mouse. It is required for maintain the receptivity phenotype and trophoblast adhesion, OVGP1 mRNA levels are reduced in endometrium of women with recurrent implantation failure.

References

Further reading